William Tomlin (15 September 1866 – 11 May 1910) was an English cricketer who played first-class cricket for Leicestershire from 1894–1899   and as a professional in the Lancashire League.

Cricket career
Tomlin made his first-class debut against Essex in May 1894. The right handed batsman highest score of 140 was scored in May 1894 in a match against Marylebone Cricket Club (MCC). His right-arm medium pace claimed eight wickets at an average of 43.25.

In April 1892, Tomlin made his first appearance in the Lancashire League as a professional for Accrington. He went on to play in 16 matches and a further five for Colne.

References

External links

Wisden obituaries of 1910

1866 births
1910 deaths
People from Broughton Astley
Cricketers from Leicestershire
Leicestershire cricketers
English cricketers